Dalton's mouse or Dalton's praomys (Praomys daltoni) is a species of rodent in the family Muridae.
It is found in Benin, Burkina Faso, Cameroon, Central African Republic, Chad, Ivory Coast, Gambia, Ghana, Guinea, Guinea-Bissau, Liberia, Mali, Niger, Nigeria, Senegal, Sierra Leone, Sudan, and Togo.
Its natural habitats are dry savanna, rocky areas, and urban areas.

References

 

Praomys
Mammals described in 1892
Taxa named by Oldfield Thomas
Taxonomy articles created by Polbot